Dimitrie Leonida (Stejaru) Hydro Power Plant is a hydropower development on the Bistrița River, near Bicaz, Romania.

The project was started and finished in the 1950s.  It consists of a dam, a reservoir, and a hydro power plant.

It formed and holds the Bicaz Lake reservoir, also known as Mountain Spring Lake ("Lacul Izvorul Muntelui").

The reservoir is the largest artificial lake in Romania; it manages river levels downstream, provides fishing, attracts tourism, fuels the power plant, and controls flooding.

The Oak Hydro-power plant ("Hidrocentrala Stejaru") is equipped with six turbines (four-27.5 MW and two-50 MW turbines) for a total installed capacity of 210 MW.  The plant generates an average of 500 GWh of electricity per year, at a capacity factor of 30%; it has produced over 20 billion MWh of electricity in the first 50 years since commissioning.

See also

Izvorul Muntelui Lake

References

External links
Description at the official Hidroelectrica website

Dams in Romania
Hydroelectric power stations in Romania
Dams completed in 1960